The shrub whiptail-skink (Emoia longicauda) is a species of skink. It is found in Indonesia, Papua New Guinea, and Queensland in Australia.

References

Emoia
Reptiles described in 1877
Taxa named by William John Macleay